The first Study Commission on the Women's Diaconate was established in August 2016 by Pope Francis to review the theology and history of the ministry of women deacons (deaconesses) in the Roman Catholic Church. Reportedly, the commission did not reach a general agreement. After the Amazonian synod, Pope Francis promised to re-open this commission. He established a second commission instead in April 2020.

Background
After existing for several centuries, the vocation of deacon was gradually transformed in the Catholic Church into an office reserved to men who were candidates for ordination as priests and were ordained as transitional deacons. Participants in the Second Vatican Council recommended the restoration of the ancient permanent diaconate with votes taken in October 1963 and September 1964. The Council's Dogmatic Constitution on the Church (Lumen gentium) said that:
 
 
Although the question of including women in the ordained diaconate was brought to the Council, in 1967, Pope Paul VI authorized the establishment of a ministry of permanent deacons, still restricted to men but open to married men. Under the rules he established, both permanent and transitional deacons belonged to a single order and were ordained according to the same rite.

The Catholic Church had examined the question of women deacons in 2002, a report by the International Theological Commission, an advisory body to the Congregation for the Doctrine of the Faith. On 26 October 2009, Pope Benedict XVI modified canon law to clarify the distinction between deacons and priests, writing that only the latter act "in the person of Christ", that the diaconate and priesthood are specific ministries rather than stages within the sacrament of order.

Archbishop Paul-André Durocher of Gatineau, Canada, raised the idea of ordaining women as deacons when speaking to the Synod on the Family in 2015, and continued to raise the issue following the synod. A few senior prelates took opposing positions on the possibility of a female diaconate, including Cardinals Walter Kasper and Gerhard Müller. Some bishops support the ordination of women as deacons.

In a May 2016 audience with women religious at the triennial assembly of the International Union of Superiors General (UISG), Pope Francis was asked about whether women could be included in the permanent diaconate, and was asked about the possibility of establishing an official commission to study the matter. Francis responded that the history was "obscure" and that it was not clear what role deaconesses played or whether they were ordained, and added: "It seems useful to me to have a commission that would clarify this well." Vatican spokesman Federico Lombardi subsequently said that Francis "did not say he intends to introduce a diaconal ordination for women and even less did he speak of the priestly ordination of women."

Creation
When Pope Francis created the Study Commission on the Women's Diaconate on 2 August 2016, he tasked it with examining the history of women serving as deaconesses in the Roman Catholic Church. He named Archbishop Luis Francisco Ladaria SJ, Secretary of the Congregation for the Doctrine of the Faith, as its President and twelve members, six women and six men:

Núria Calduch Benages, member of the Pontifical Biblical Commission
Francesca Cocchini, faculty member at La Sapienza University (Rome) and the Patristic Institute Augustinianum
, president of Sophia University Institute (Rome), member of the International Theological Commission
Robert Dodaro OSA, president of the Patristic Institute Augustinianum
Santiago Madrigal SJ, ecclesiologist at the Pontifical University Comillas (Madrid)
Mary Melone SFA, president of the Pontifical University Antonianum (Rome)
, emeritus professor of dogmatic theology at the University of Bonn, member of the International Theological Commission
Aimable Musoni SDB, ecclesiologist at Salesian Pontifical University (Rome)
Bernard Pottier SJ, faculty member at Institute D'etudes Théologiques (Brussels), member of the International Theological Commission
, theologian at the University of Vienna, member of the International Theological Commission;
Michelina Tenace, theologian at the Pontifical Gregorian University (Rome)
Phyllis Zagano, senior research associate-in-residence at Hofstra University (New York)

The commission's members appear divided in their views. Zagano has written a book titled Holy Saturday: An Argument for the Restoration of the Female Diaconate in the Catholic Church, while Menke has argued that women cannot be deacons because they cannot be priests.

In August 2016, the UISG thanked the Pope for following through on his commitment and for the number of women members.

Work of the first Study Commission and outcome 
The Commission held its first meeting in November 2016 in Rome.

The Study Commission produced an initial report to Pope Francis by January 2019. In May 2019, Francis said the Study Commission had not yet produced a "definitive response" due to a lack of consensus regarding the role of deaconesses in early Christianity. Francis stated that: "They worked together. And they found agreement up to a certain point. But each one of them has their own vision, which doesn't accord with that of the others. They stopped there as a commission, and each one is studying and going ahead." While Francis indicated that individual study continued, he did not indicate whether the Study Commission remains active as a body.

Second Commission 
The Amazonian synod called for a continued study of the female diaconate. Pope Francis promised first to re-open the previous commission but then decided to established a new commission on 8 April 2020 with the following members:

 Giuseppe Petrocchi, Cardinal and president of the Commission
 Denis Dupont-Fauville, secretary of the Commission
 James Keating
 Dominic Cerrato
 
 Angelo Lameri
 
 
 Catherine Brown Tkacz
 Caroline Farey
 Anne-Marie Pelletier
 Rosalba Manes

See also
Deaconess
Women in the Catholic Church

References

2016 establishments in Vatican City
Catholic theology and doctrine
Catholicism and women
Organizations based in Vatican City
Pope Francis
Catholic ecclesiastical titles